Waguih Rauf Aboul Seoud (8 February 1946 – 12 January 2013) was an Egyptian diver. He competed in the 1968 Summer Olympics.

References

1946 births
2013 deaths
Divers at the 1968 Summer Olympics
Egyptian male divers
Olympic divers of Egypt
Sportspeople from Cairo
20th-century Egyptian people
21st-century Egyptian people